Water lily or water lilies may refer to:

Plants 
 Members of family Nymphaeaceae
 Formerly, members of the genus Nelumbo (the genus to which lotus belongs)
 Some members of the genus Nymphoides

Other uses 
 Water Lilies (Monet series), a series of paintings by Claude Monet
 Water Lilies (film), a 2007 French film
 The Water Lily (1919 film), a 1919 silent film directed by George Ridgwell
 The Water Lily, or Nénuphar, a ballet fantastique in one act, first presented in 1890
 Water Lily Acoustics, a record label
 Water Lily (My Little Pony), a character from the My Little Pony entertainment franchise
 Water Lily (Wild Cards), a character from the Wild Cards book series
 Waterlillies (duo), a musical group
 Waterlily (novel), a 1988 novel by Ella Cara Deloria